Captive Nations Week is an annual official observance in the United States aimed at demonstrating solidarity with "captive nations" under the control of authoritarian governments.

Background
Initially, the week was aimed at raising public awareness of the Soviet occupation of Eastern European countries and of Soviet support for Communist regimes in other regions of the world.

The week was first declared by a Congressional resolution in 1953 and signed into law  (Public Law 86-90) by President Dwight D. Eisenhower in 1959. Every successive U.S. President, including President Barack Obama, President Donald Trump and President Joe Biden, has declared the third week of July to be Captive Nations Week. During the Cold War, events of Captive Nations Week were sometimes attended by US Presidents, mayors and governors.Remarks at a Ceremony Marking the Annual Observance of Captive Nations Week by President Ronald Reagan, 1983 - Ronald Reagan Presidential Library and Museum

Present day
After the collapse of Communist regimes in Eastern Europe, the week is also dedicated to supporting the newly democratic governments of these countries.

Diasporas from undemocratic countries participate in events of the Captive Nations Week to draw public attention to problems with democracy and human rights in their respective home countries. Members of the Belarusian American community have been constituting a major part of the participants of Captive Nations Week marches in recent years. In 2019, among the topics of the Captive Nations March has been solidarity with Oleg Sentsov and other Ukrainians held captive by Russia at that time.

In 2019 Marion Smith, Executive Director of the Victims of Communism Memorial Foundation, has called for a resurrection of the Captive Nations Week because of a number of countries like China, Vietnam, North Korea or Laos still living under authoritarian and totalitarian Communist regimes along with Ukraine being the target of Russian military aggression.

In his 2022 proclamation, President Biden named several officially communist countries (Cuba, North Korea and China) and a number of non-communist countries (Russia, Iran, Belarus, Syria, Venezuela and Nicaragua) as captive nations but did not mention two officially communist countries, Laos and Vietnam.

Criticism
The American foreign policy expert George Kennan, serving at the time as ambassador to Yugoslavia, sought unsuccessfully to dissuade President John F. Kennedy from proclaiming the week on the grounds that the United States had no reason to make the resolution, which in effect called for the overthrow of all Communist governments in Eastern Europe, a part of public policy.

Russian emigres to the United States (specifically representatives of the Congress of Russian Americans) argued that the Captive Nations Week was anti-Russian rather than anti-Communist since the list of "captive nations" did not include Russians, thus implying that the blame for the oppression of nations lies on the Russian nation rather than on the Soviet regime (Dobriansky's allegedly Ukrainian nationalist views were named as the reason for this). Members of the Congress have campaigned for nullification of the Captive Nations law.

Nevertheless, in his official address on the Captive Nations Week in 1983, President Ronald Reagan quoted Russian dissident writers Alexander Solzhenitsyn and Alexander Herzen.

A group of prominent American historians issued a statement claiming that PL 86-90 and the Captive Nations Week was largely based on misinformation and committed the United States to aiding "ephemeral" nations such as Cossackia and Idel-Ural.

See also
Soviet Empire
National Captive Nations Committee
Congress of the Enslaved Peoples of Russia
Europe Day

References

Bibliography
 Address of the Russian intellectuals to the Congress of the United States of America - Social Design Corporation. July 14, 2008.    
 Fighting the 'Captive Nations Week Resolution' (Archived) - Congress of Russian Americans, Inc.  1999.  
 Captive Nations Week, 2008  White House.  2008. 
 Tim Weiner and Barbara Crossette. "George F. Kennan Dies at 101; Leading Strategist of Cold War".  The New York Times.  March 18, 2005.
 George F. Kennan: Cold War Iconoclast.  Walter Hixson, 1988.

External links
 ISA YUSUF ALPTEKIN, 'MEMORANDUM SENT TO RICHARD NIXON, PRESIDENT OF THE UNITED STATES OF AMERICA' (written for Captive Nations Week 1969)

Anti-communism in the United States
July observances
Awareness weeks in the United States
Cold War
Belarusian independence movement
Belarus–United States relations
Turn of the third millennium
Soviet Union–United States relations